The List of Governors of Córdoba may refer to:
 List of Governors of Córdoba (Colombian department)
 List of Governors of Córdoba (Argentine province), see Governor of Córdoba (Argentine province)